FC Grănicerul Glodeni  is a Moldovan football club based in Glodeni, Moldova. They play in the Moldovan "A" Division, the second tier of Moldovan football. They won the Division B North group in the 2016–17 season.

Achievements
Divizia B
 Winners (1): 2016–17

External links
 on Soccerway.com

Football clubs in Moldova
Association football clubs established in 1970
1970 establishments in the Moldavian Soviet Socialist Republic